Phylini is a tribe of plant bugs in the family Miridae, based on the type genus Phylus. There are at least 440 described species in Phylini.

Subtribes and selected Genera
 Full list of Phylini genera here

Keltoniina

Auth. Schuh & Menard, 2013
 Keltonia Knight, 1966 - Nearctic
 Pseudatomoscelis Poppius, 1911 - Caribbean, Mexico
 Reuteroscopus Kirkaldy, 1905 - New World

Oncotylina

Auth. Douglas & Scott, 1865

 Americodema T. Henry, 1999 - Nearctic
 Asciodema Reuter, 1878 - Palearctic, Nearctic
 Brachyarthrum Fieber, 1858 - Palearctic
 Europiella Reuter, 1909 - Holarctic
 Europiellomorpha Duwal, 2014
 Oncotylus Fieber, 1858 - Holarctic
 Parapsallus Wagner, 1952 - Palearctic
 Phyllopidea Knight, 1919 - Western Nearctic
 Placochilus Fieber, 1858 - Palearctic
 Plagiognathus Fieber, 1858 - Holarctic
 Plesiodema Reuter, 1875 - Holarctic
 Psallodema V. Putshkov, 1970 - Palearctic
 Ranzovius Distant, 1893 - Americas
 Rhinocapsus Uhler, 1890 - Eastern Nearctic
 Sthenaropsidea Henry & Schuh, 2002 - Eastern Nearctic
 Tinicephalus Fieber, 1858 - Palearctic

Phylina
Auth. Douglas & Scott, 1865
 Conostethus Fieber, 1858 - Holarctic
 Lepidargyrus Muminov, 1962 - Palearctic
 Orthonotus Stephens, 1829 - Palearctic
 Orthophylus Duwal & Lee, 2011
 Phylus Hahn, 1831 - Palearctic
 Psallus Fieber, 1858 - Holarctic
 Sthenarus Fieber, 1858 - Palearctic

References

 Henry, Thomas J., and Richard C. Froeschner, eds. (1988). Catalog of the Heteroptera, or True Bugs, of Canada and the Continental United States, xix + 958.
 Thomas J. Henry, Richard C. Froeschner. (1988). Catalog of the Heteroptera, True Bugs of Canada and the Continental United States. Brill Academic Publishers.

Further reading

 NCBI Taxonomy Browser, Phylini
 

 
Hemiptera tribes